M111 may refer to:

 M-111 (Michigan highway), two former state highways
 , a British Royal Navy Sandown-class minehunter
 Mercedes-Benz M111 engine, an automobile engine
 CWS M111, a Polish 1930s motorcycle